/r/ may refer to:

 an imageboard for adult requests on 4chan
 Reddit, from the "/r/" prefix appended to the names of subreddits
 the IPA notation for a dental, alveolar and postalveolar trill or rhotic consonant